Georgi is a German surname.

Notable people with the surname include: 
 Friedrich von Georgi (1852–1926), general of the Austro-Hungarian Army
 Howard Georgi (born 1947), American physicist
 Johann Gottlieb Georgi (1729–1802), German naturalist and geographer
 Pfeiffer Georgi (born 2000), British racing cyclist
 Susanne Georgi (born 1976), Danish singer
 Yvonne Georgi (1903–1975), German dancer, choreographer, and ballet mistress

German-language surnames